Thene Manasulu is a 1987 Indian Telugu-language film written and directed by Rajendra Singh Babu, produced by K. C. N. Chandrasekhar for KCN Films starring Krishna, Jaya Prada and Suhasini. Bappi Lahiri scored and composed the film's soundtrack. The film was a remake of Hindi film Souten. Krishna had debuted with the 1965 film of the same name Thene Manasulu.

Cast 
 Krishna as Krishna
 Jaya Prada
 Suhasini
 Kaikala Satyanarayana
 Jaggayya
 Nutan Prasad
 Giribabu
 Y. Vijaya
 Nagesh
 Raj Babu
 Pradeep Shakti
 Fight Master Raju

Music 
Bappil Lahiri scored and composed the film's soundtrack. Veturi Sundararama Murthy penned the lyrics.

 "Veedkolide Sodari — P. Susheela
 "Alare Alare" — P. Susheela
 "Naa Praname" — P. Susheela
 "Govinda Govinda" — Raj Sitaram
 "Mummy Mummy" — P. Susheela, Raj Sitaram
 "Mammayya Mammayya" — P. Susheela, Raj Sitaram
 "Neeve Chente" — P. Susheela, Raj Sitaram

References

External links 

Thene Manasulu on Twitter

1987 films
1980s Telugu-language films
Indian drama films
Telugu remakes of Hindi films
Films directed by Rajendra Singh Babu
Films scored by Bappi Lahiri
1987 drama films